Falling Swinger is the seventh studio album by Australian singer-songwriter Stephen Cummings. The album was released in August 1994.

The album was listed in Rolling Stone Australia's list of "100 Essential Australian albums".

Reception
Shaun Carney from Rolling Stone Australia gave the album 4 out of 5 stars, saying that "Cummings has, during the past 10 years, made several truly great, if underappreciated, albums. This could well be his best.", adding "Without doubt, the album, produced by Steve Kilbey, is a bold departure for [Cummings]. Kilbey appears to have viewed Cummings' talent as being something potentially lighter than air and has loosened the performer's moorings. This has enabled Cummings to drift upwards, into a world of soundscapes, transforming his approach to songs and singing and allowing him to finally shuck off the last discernible traces of his influences. Falling Swinger sees Cummings as a man liberated from his time and his age."

Jon Casimir from the Sydney Morning Herald said that "This is the best album Stephen Cummings has ever made. It's also the best local album of 1994. Falling Swinger is a drifting, dreamy travelogue, a collection of carefully realised, intoxicating visions", adding that "Produced by The Church's Steve Kilbey, it displays a revitalised, refocused and realigned Cummings, bursting with creativity."

Toby Creswell from Juice magazine said that "the tunes range from raw confessions to cooked commercial pop ... sublime, Cummings at his best".

Track listing

Release history

References 

1994 albums
Stephen Cummings albums
Polydor Records albums